ClassTV was an Italian TV Channel launched in 2003 owned by Class Editori (who also own Class CNBC).

The channel originally launched as an all-news channel and renamed before Class News msnbc on 6 September 2010 and after ClassTV MSNBC on 2 May 2011.

It was later relaunched as an Italian news and movie channel before its closure. It was broadcast in Italy on DTT channel 27 on Mux Mediaset 2.

On 27 January 2015, the channel ceased transmission, and was replaced by a series of filter to promote Sky TG24's launch over the air.

Programming
Class CNBC, Class Life and Class TV Moda are the three television channels of Class Editori. As a whole they constitute a TV bouquet that is unique in Italy, both for the kind of content and products provided to the public both for the positioning of the channels.

Among the strengths of the television offering of Class Editori, the partnership with NBC Universal, one of the world's leading media production and entertainment content provider.

Old version of ClassTV have transmitted all day:

 news including current affairs, talk show, business, sport
 Quelli del lunedì, Primo tempo, Punto e a capo, TG Giorno, TG Sera, Capital - La sfida, Watchdog
 NBC news NBC Nightly News
  weather programs including precise forecasts for all world by the Weather Channel
 Classmeteo SHOW, Lombroso variabile
  lifestyle and luxury programming
 Models NYC, Ladies, "Design & Living" Class Life 7, ARTV, Porsche Live, Class Ride & Drive.
 scientific, technology and medical programs
 Avatar, il mondo nuovo, Una vita per la scienza, My Tech Lab, Doctor 2+.

Instead, every Tuesday and Wednesday are transmitted:

 Solo Classici including movies and TV series La meglio gioventù, I viceré, Maria José - L'ultima Regina, I ragazzi di via Panispema, Giovanni Falcone, Genova - La Superba.

On Friday is broadcast the heading on Italian cinema' Cinema Italiano Sono Loro!''

TV hosts
 Emmanuela Anderle
 Angela Antetomaso
 Giada Borioli
 Maurizio Bossi
 Edoardo Calcagno
 Lorenzo Catania
 Davide Dalla Libera (weatherman)
 Dario Donato
 Manuela Donghi
 Carlo Frioli
 Davide Fumagalli
 Marco Gaiazzi
 Serena Giacomin (weatherwoman)
 Luca Lombroso (weatherman in 2000s)
 Sergio Luciano
 Cristina Finocchi Mahne
 Alessandro Cecchi Paone
 Mariangela Pira
 Michele Salmi (weatherman)
 Linda Santaguida
 Silvia Sgaravatti
 Maurizio Toma
 Christian Toscano
 Marina Valerio
 Matteo Zanetti (weatherman)
 Michele Cicoria (weatherman)

Applications

Class CNBC channel is distributed also through the most advanced multimedia platforms: www.milanofinanza.it (streaming), "Le TV di Class Editori", App, and Telesia's GO TV.

Places of transmission

It is transmitted even in 35 airports and in the Milan Subway.

Logos

See also
Digital television in Italy
Television film

References

External links
ClassEditori  

Italian-language television stations
Television channels and stations established in 2003
Movie channels
Class Editori